Suha Jora is a 2007 Pakistani Punjabi film directed by Pervez Rana starring Shaan, Nargis. Film music was composed by the renowned composer Tafoo and the film song lyrics were by Altaf Bajwa.

Cast
 Shaan
 Nargis
 Sidra Noor
 Mustafa Qureshi
 Safqat Cheema
 Syed Raza Ali Rizvi (Child Actor)

This film's music was composed by Tafoo and film song lyrics were by Altaf Bajwa. Film songs were sung by Naseebo Lal and Humaira Channa.

References

External links
 Film 'Suha Jora' (2007) on YouTube 

Punjabi-language Pakistani films
2007 films
2000s Punjabi-language films